Hietala is a Finnish surname. Notable people with the surname include:

Marko Hietala (born 1966), Finnish musician
Ryan Hietala (born 1973), American golfer
Ukko Hietala (1904–1990), Finnish modern pentathlete
Utti Hietala (born 1983), Finnish bodybuilder
Zachary Hietala (born 1962), Finnish musician

Finnish-language surnames